Gallaudet is a surname, and may reer to

 Edson Fessenden Gallaudet (1871–1945), American pioneer in the field of aviation
 Edward Miner Gallaudet (1837–1917), American educator of the deaf 
 John Gallaudet (1903–1983), American film and television actor
 Peter Wallace Gallaudet (1756–1843), personal secretary to US President George Washington in Philadelphia
 Sophia Fowler Gallaudet (1798–1877), American activist for the deaf, wife of Thomas Hopkins Gallaudet.
 Thomas Hopkins Gallaudet (1788–1852), American educator of the deaf 
 Thomas Thomas Gallaudet (1822–1902), American Episcopal priest
 Timothy Gallaudet, American oceanographer